The Battle of Khwar Pass was a failed ambush set up by Ashraf Hotaki during his retreat in the aftermath of his defeat at the Battle of Damghan (1729). Gathering what forces lay on his route, Ashraf pulled together another formidable fighting force around the remains of his badly bloodied force, even having enough men to spare for an ambush set up at a narrow pass east of Varamin.

Battle 
Placing hidden guns and sharpshooters on the high ground overlooking the pass and fortifying the narrow pathway Ashraf even left a significant body of cavalry behind in order to hunt down the survivors of the ambush. Nader's spies however reported on Ashraf's designs at Khwar. Skirting around the ambush Nader, personally taking command, launched a two-pronged assault utilizing musketeers with artillery support, catching the Afghans in an ambush of his own, forcing the Pashtuns to flee leaving their guns and baggage behind.

Consequences 

As a result of the battle, Nader's advance into the heart of Iran and onto the capital Isfahan lay open. Nader however chose to take a longer route further to the west for reasons of superior logistical support. This also had the benefit of surprise with the defeated Afghans unable to mount a serious obstacle to Nader's advance on Isfahan until he had already reached Murcheh-Khort, a town just a mere few kilometres north of Isfahan itself.

Sources
 Michael Axworthy, The Sword of Persia: Nader Shah, from Tribal Warrior to Conquering Tyrant Hardcover 348 pages (26 July 2006) Publisher: I.B. Tauris  Language: English

See also 
Battle of Murche-Khort
Liberation of Isfahan
Battle of Zarghan

Battles involving Safavid Iran
Conflicts in 1729